Cappataggle GAA is a Gaelic Athletic Association club located in the village of Cappataggle, County Galway, Ireland. The club was founded in 1885 and is exclusively concerned with the game of hurling.
The club built a state of the art astro pitch in 2009.

History
Established in 1885

Honours

 Connacht Intermediate Club Hurling Championship (1): 2008, 2014
 Galway Senior Hurling League (1):2019
 Galway Intermediate Hurling Championship: (3): 1962, 2008, 2014
 Galway Intermediate Hurling League (3): 2008, 2013, 2014 
 Galway Junior A Hurling Championship (1): 1994
 Galway Junior B Hurling Championship (2): 1989, 2021
 Galway Junior C Hurling Championship (1): 1987
 Galway Junior C1 Hurling (1): 2013
 Galway Under-21 C Hurling Championship (2): 1996, 1998
 Galway Under-21 B Hurling Championship (1): 2011
 Galway Minor B Hurling Championship (2): 1958, 2013, 2019

Notable players

James Skehill

References

External links

Cappataggle GAA site

Gaelic games clubs in County Galway
Hurling clubs in County Galway